William Hubert Rompkey  (May 13, 1936 – March 21, 2017) was a Canadian educator who served as member of Parliament from 1972 to 1995 and a senator from 1995 to 2011.

Early life and education
Rompkey was born in Belleoram, Fortune Bay, Newfoundland. He attended Bishop Feild College in St. John's. In 1953, after he left Bishop Feild College, Rompkey entered Memorial University, where he graduated with a BA, a diploma in education, and an MA.  Rompkey continued his studies at the University of London, England, where he received the Academic Diploma in Education.

Career as an educator
After Rompkey returned from his studies in London, he started his career as an educator. Rompkey taught school at Upper Island Cove and in St. John's. In 1963, he married fellow Memorial University graduate Carolyn Pike, and then, lured by Tony Paddon, Rompkey took an appointment as principal of the Yale Amalgamated School in North West River.   Rompkey later became the first Superintendent of Education with the Labrador East Integrated School Board, a position he held until 1971. In January 1972, Rompkey was studying for his Ph.D. in Adult Education at the University of Toronto when he won the nomination to represent the Grand Falls-White Bay-Labrador riding for the Liberal Party.

Parliamentary career

The House of Commons
Rompkey was first elected to the House of Commons of Canada in the 1972 federal election as the Liberal Member of Parliament (MP) for Grand Falls-White Bay-Labrador, the first of seven consecutive election victories. In 1980, Prime Minister Pierre Trudeau elevated Rompkey to the Canadian Cabinet as Minister of National Revenue. In 1982, he was moved to the position of Minister of State for Small Businesses and Tourism becoming Minister of State for Mines in 1984. He was Minister of State for Transport in the short lived Cabinet of John Turner until the government's defeat in the 1984 election.

Senate
In 1995, Governor General of Canada Roméo LeBlanc, on the advice of Prime Minister Jean Chrétien, appointed Rompkey to the Senate of Canada. In 2001, he became Government Whip in the Senate and was deputy leader of the government in the Senate until the Conservatives took power in February 2006. He reached the mandatory retirement age of 75 on May 13, 2011.

References

External links
 
 Biography from Memorial University

1936 births
2017 deaths
Alumni of the University of London
Canadian Anglicans
Canadian senators from Newfoundland and Labrador
Liberal Party of Canada MPs
Liberal Party of Canada senators
Members of the 22nd Canadian Ministry
Members of the 23rd Canadian Ministry
Members of the House of Commons of Canada from Newfoundland and Labrador
Bishop Feild School alumni
21st-century Canadian politicians